Jazz Station is a jazz club and exhibition venue in Saint-Josse-ten-Noode in the Belgian district of Brussels.

History 
Jazz Station was established as an exhibition venue in the former train station at Leuvensesteenweg and was inaugurated on 30 September 2005. The initiative comes from Jean Demannez (first), a jazz drummer and from 1999 to 2012 mayor of Saint-Josse-ten-Noode. The opening was conducted by the mayor.

The showed a variety of jazz related pieces, including records, photo's, posters, magazines and articles. Part of the collection comes from jazz historian ,  and jazz publicist Marc Danval; both are jazz musicians. Les Lundis d'Hortense, a Belgian society of jazz musicians organizes concerts on a weekly base. Varying exhibitions are shown, and the venue maintains an archive and serves as a meeting place for jazz musicians. Young composers can have it performed by the big band of Jazz Station. This ensemble is directed by Michel Parré.

References 

Jazz clubs in Belgium
Saint-Josse-ten-Noode
Belgian jazz
2005 establishments in Belgium